Mugur Cristian Bolohan (born 28 May 1976) is a retired Romanian footballer.

Honours
Rapid București
Liga I: 1998–99
Cupa României: 1997–98
Supercupa României: 1999
Dinamo București
Liga I: 2001–02, 2003–04
Cupa României: 2000–01

External links

1976 births
Living people
Sportspeople from Suceava
Romanian footballers
Romania international footballers
Liga I players
Liga II players
Cypriot First Division players
FCM Bacău players
FC Progresul București players
FC Dinamo București players
FC Rapid București players
FC U Craiova 1948 players
FC Universitatea Cluj players
Nea Salamis Famagusta FC players
FCM Câmpina players
Romanian expatriate footballers
Expatriate footballers in Cyprus
Romanian expatriate sportspeople in Cyprus
Expatriate footballers in Greece
Romanian expatriate sportspeople in Greece
Association football defenders
Romanian football managers
LPS HD Clinceni managers